Marcoux may refer to:

People with the surname
 Valérie Marcoux, Canadian figure skater
 Pierre Marcoux, Sr., political figure in Lower Canada
 Pierre Marcoux, militia officer in Lower Canada
 Yvon Marcoux, Canadian politician
 Sauveur Marcoux, Canadian politician

Places in France
 Marcoux, Alpes-de-Haute-Provence, a commune in the department of Alpes-de-Haute-Provence
 Marcoux, Loire, a commune in the department of Loire

See also
 Marcoux Corner
 Micheline Coulombe Saint-Marcoux